MetroLyrics was a website dedicated to song lyrics.  It was founded in December 2002, and its database contained over one million songs by over 16,000 artists. Unlike other lyric websites, MetroLyrics places a warning on songs that contain explicit lyrics so that users can proceed with caution. The site abruptly went offline in late June 2021, and as of November 2022 its owners and maintainers have made no explanation.

History
In 2008, MetroLyrics was the first lyrics-dedicated site to license Gracenote Inc.'s lyrics catalogue. Through its licensing model, copyright holders of lyrics accrue royalty revenue when their work is displayed on MetroLyrics.com, which MetroLyrics recoups by collecting money from banner advertisements on its site. Royalties are paid on all displayed lyrics and are handled through Gracenote. In January 2013, LyricFind acquired Gracenote's lyrics licensing business, merging it in with their own. MetroLyrics' licensing model is distinct, as many lyrics websites offer content that is unlicensed and possibly copyright infringing.

MetroLyrics was acquired by CBS Interactive in October 2011. Red Ventures acquired the CNET Media Group, including MetroLyrics, from CBS Interactive in 2020.

References

External links
 

Canadian music websites
Companies based in Vancouver
Internet properties established in 2002
Internet properties disestablished in 2021
Online archives
Online music and lyrics databases
Technology companies of Canada
Former CBS Interactive websites
Red Ventures
2002 establishments in British Columbia
2021 disestablishments in British Columbia
2020 mergers and acquisitions